Camael, ( Ḥammūʾēl, "God has warmed") also spelled Chamuel, Khamuel, Camiel, Cameel and Camniel, is an archangel in Jewish and Christian angelology.

According to poet Gustav Davidson's popular work A Dictionary of Angels, Including the Fallen Angels (1967), he is known as one of the twelve Kabbalah angels, assigned to the sephira Gevurah, alongside the planet Mars. Camael's name is also included in Pseudo-Dionysius the Areopagite's 5th or 6th century  as one of the Seven Archangels along with Michael, Gabriel, Raphael, Uriel, Jophiel, and Zadkiel.

Camael was excluded from the Holy See's list of named angels in the 2001 Directory on popular piety, which states: "The practice of assigning names to the Holy Angels should be discouraged, except in the cases of Gabriel, Raphael and Michael whose names are contained in Holy Scripture".

See also
 List of angels in theology

References

Further reading
 Bamberger, Bernard Jacob, (March 15, 2006). Fallen Angels: Soldiers of Satan's Realm. Jewish Publication Society of America. 
 Briggs, Constance Victoria, 1997. The Encyclopedia of Angels : An A-to-Z Guide with Nearly 4,000 Entries. Plume. .
 Bunson, Matthew, (1996). Angels A to Z : A Who's Who of the Heavenly Host.  Three Rivers Press. .
 Cruz, Joan C. 1999. Angels and Devils. Tan Books & Publishers. .
 Davidson, Gustav (1967) A Dictionary of Angels: Including the Fallen Angels. Free Press. 
 Graham, Billy, 1994. Angels: God's Secret Agents. W Pub Group; Minibook edition. 
 Guiley, Rosemary, 1996. Encyclopedia of Angels. 
 Kreeft, Peter J. 1995. Angels and Demons: What Do We Really Know About Them? Ignatius Press. 
 Lewis, James R. (1995). Angels A to Z. Visible Ink Press. 
 Melville, Francis, 2001. The Book of Angels: Turn to Your Angels for Guidance, Comfort, and Inspiration. Barron's Educational Series; 1st edition. 
 Ronner, John, 1993. Know Your Angels: The Angel Almanac With Biographies of 100 Prominent Angels in Legend & Folklore-And Much More! Mamre Press. .

Angels in Christianity
Angels in Judaism
Archangels
Individual angels
Anglican saints